Dynamo Stadium is a multi-use stadium in Barnaul, Russia.  It is currently used mostly for football matches and is the home ground of FC Dynamo Barnaul.  The stadium holds 22,000 people.

See also 
Dynamo (disambiguation)

Football venues in Russia
Sport in Barnaul
Dynamo sports society
Buildings and structures in Altai Krai